Glavinić is a Serbo-Croatian family name. Notable people with this name include:

 Sebastijan Glavinić (1632–1697), Croatian Roman Catholic bishop
 Thomas Glavinic (1972), Austrian writer

References 

Croatian surnames
Serbian surnames